Hispanophone and Hispanic refers to anything relating to the Spanish language (the Hispanosphere).

In a cultural, rather than merely linguistic sense, the notion of "Hispanophone" goes further than the above definition. The Hispanic culture is the legacy of the vast and prolonged Spanish Empire, and so the term can refer to people whose cultural background is primarily associated with Spain, regardless of racial or geographical differences. The whole sense of identity of the Hispanic population and the Hispanophones is sometimes referred by the term Hispanidad (Hispanicity).

They are also terms used to refer to speakers of the Spanish language and the Spanish-speaking world. The Spanish-speaking regions are: Spain, Hispanic America, Equatorial Guinea, Western Sahara, the Canary Islands, Philippines and the Easter Island. The Global Sefardí Culture, The Southwest of the United States and Guam are also considered part of the Hispanosphere.

The terms are derived from the Latin word Hispanicus ("Spanish") which refers to anything pertaining to the Roman province of Hispania ("Spain"). In addition to the general definition of Hispanophone, some groups in the Hispanic world make a distinction between Castilian-speaking and Spanish-speaking, with the former term denoting the speakers of the Spanish language—also known as Castilian—and the latter the speakers of the Spanish or Hispanic languages (i.e. the languages of Spain or the languages of the Hispanic nations).

The Hispanosphere
Hispanophones are estimated at between 480 and 577 million (including second language speakers) globally, making Spanish the second most spoken language in terms of native speakers. Around 360 million live in Hispanic America and 45 million in Spain (70 million in Europe). There are more than 52 million Spanish speakers in the United States. There are also smaller Hispanophone groups in Canada, northern Morocco, Equatorial Guinea, Western Sahara, and Brazil as well as in many other places around the world, particularly other countries of European Union, where it is one of 24 official languages, and Australia.

Countries

During the Spanish period between 1492 and 1898, many people from Spain migrated to the new lands they had conquered. The Spaniards took with them their language and culture,
and integrated within the society they had settled, creating a large empire that stretched all over the world and producing several multiracial populations. Their influences are found in the following continents and countries that were originally colonized by the Spaniards.

List of countries

Europe

Spain

The modern-day people that live in the region of ancient Hispania are the Portuguese, Spanish, Andorran and Gibraltarian people. Historically, the modern country of Spain was formed by the accretion of several independent Iberian kingdoms through dynastic inheritance, conquest and the will of the local elites. These kingdoms had their own nationalistic loyalties and political borders.

Today, there is no single Castilian–Spanish identity for the whole country. Spain is a de facto plurinational state. Many Spanish citizens feel no conflict in recognising their multiple ethnic identities at the same time. Spain is a culturally heterogeneous country, home to a wide range of cultures, each one with its own customs and traditions. Some such cultures have their own language. Since the beginning of the transition to democracy in Spain and the creation of the Spanish autonomous communities, after Francoist Spain, there have been many movements towards more autonomy (delegation of powers) in certain territories of the country, some with the aim of achieving full independence and others with the goal of improving the system of devolution and the state of the autonomies (or self-government entities) .

The existence of multiple distinct cultures in Spain allows an analogy to be drawn to the United Kingdom. Using the term Spanish for someone of Spanish descent would then be expected to be equivalent to using Briton to describe someone descending from some part of the United Kingdom. Cultures within the United Kingdom, such as English, Irish, Scottish, and Welsh, would then correspond in this analogy to cultures within Spain such as Castilian, Catalan, Galician and Basque among others. In contrast with Spain, because of centuries of gradual and mutual consolidation across the Iberian Peninsula, such distinctions tend to be blurred. It is a subtle, yet important, distinction.

In Spain, as in the United Kingdom, the economically dominant territories—Castile and England—spread their language for mutual communication. However, the political dominance in the United Kingdom tends to be sharper compared to Spain, where most of medieval realms do not correspond with the actual boundaries of the autonomous communities, and the crown was unified into a sole monarch.

Americas

Hispanic America

Spanish is the most widely-spoken language of the Americas, as well as the official language in a great part of the Americas.

United States

Origins and demography
U.S. Hispanics are citizens of the United States whose ancestry or national origin is of any of the nations composing the Hispanosphere. A Hispanic person's status is independent from whether or not he or she speaks the Spanish language, for not all Hispanic Americans speak Spanish. A Hispanic person may be of any race (White, Amerindian, mixed, Black, Asian or Pacific Islander).  Hispanics accounted for 17.1% of the population, around 53.2 million people. This was an increase of 29% since 2004, when Hispanics were 14.1% of the population (around 41.3 million people). The Hispanic growth rate over the July 1, 2003 to July 1, 2004, period was 3.6% — higher than any other ancestral group in the United States — and more than three times the rate of the nation's total population (at 1.0%). The projected Hispanic population of the United States for July 1, 2050, is 105.6 million people. According to this projection, Hispanics will constitute 25% of the nation's total population by the year 2050.

Historically, a continuous Hispanic presence in the territory of the United States has existed since the 16th century, earlier than any other group after the Amerindians. Spaniards pioneered the present-day United States. The first confirmed European landing on the continent was that of Juan Ponce de León, who landed in 1513 on the shore he christened La Florida. Within three decades of Ponce de León's landing, the Spanish became the first Europeans to reach the Appalachian Mountains, the Mississippi River, the Grand Canyon, and the Great Plains. Spanish ships sailed along the East Coast, penetrating to present-day Bangor, Maine, and up the Pacific Coast as far as Oregon.

In 1540 Hernando de Soto undertook an extensive exploration of the present United States. In the same year Francisco Vásquez de Coronado led 2,000 Spaniards and Mexican Indians across today's Arizona–Mexico border and traveled as far as central Kansas, close to the exact geographic center of what is now the continental United States. Other Spanish explorers of the United States make up a long list that includes, among others, Lucas Vásquez de Ayllón, Pánfilo de Narváez, Sebastián Vizcaíno, Juan Rodríguez Cabrillo, Gaspar de Portolà, Pedro Menéndez de Avilés, Álvar Núñez Cabeza de Vaca, Tristán de Luna y Arellano, and Juan de Oñate. In all, Spaniards probed half of today's lower 48 states before the first English colonization attempt at Roanoke Island in 1585.

The Spanish created the first permanent European settlement in the continental United States, at St. Augustine, Florida, in 1565. Santa Fe, New Mexico also predates Jamestown, Virginia (founded in 1607) and Plymouth Colony (of Mayflower and Pilgrims fame, founded in 1620). Later came Spanish settlements in San Antonio, Tucson, San Diego, Los Angeles, and San Francisco, to name just a few. The Spanish even established a Jesuit mission in Virginia's Chesapeake Bay 37 years before the founding of Jamestown.

Two iconic American stories have Spanish antecedents, too. Almost 80 years before John Smith's alleged rescue by Pocahontas, a man by the name of Juan Ortiz told of his remarkably similar rescue from execution by an Indian girl. Spaniards also held a thanksgiving—56 years before the famous Pilgrims festival—when they feasted near St. Augustine with Florida Indians, probably on stewed pork and garbanzo beans. As late as 1783, at the end of the American Revolutionary War, Spain held claim to roughly half of today's continental United States (see New Spain); in 1775, Spanish ships even reached Alaska. From 1819 to 1848, the United States increased the nation's area by roughly a third of former Spanish and Mexican territory, including today's three most populous states: California, Texas, and Florida. Hispanics became the first American citizens in the newly acquired Southwest territory and remained the ancestral majority in several states until the 20th century, and a large minority in the 21st century.

Hispanic Americans have fought in all the wars of the United States and have earned some of the highest distinctions awarded to U.S. soldiers (list of Hispanic Medal of Honor recipients). Historic figures in the United States have been Hispanic from early times. Some recent famous people of Hispanic descent in the U.S. include actress Rita Hayworth, singer Linda Ronstadt, and baseball legends Lefty Gomez and Ted Williams.

National Hispanic Heritage Month
The National Hispanic Heritage Month is celebrated in the United States from September 15 to October 15.

Diversity

 
The people of Hispanophone countries encompass many different ethnic backgrounds. Though in countries like the United States, Hispanics may often be stereotyped as having a typical Mediterranean/Southern European appearance - olive skin, dark hair, and dark eyes.

Most Hispanics in the United States have their origins in countries such as El Salvador, Paraguay, and Mexico, with 90% of Salvadorans, 95% of Paraguayans, and 70% of Mexicans identifying as mestizo, with Mexico having the largest total mestizo population at over 66 million.

In the United States, Hispanics, regardless of self-identified racial background, are labeled Hispanic by the U.S. census. They may have varying of European ancestry, such as Spanish origins, and Amerindian or African roots. From 1850 to 1920, the U.S. Census form did not distinguish between whites and Mexican Americans. In 1930, the U.S. Census form asked for "color or race," and census enumerators were instructed to write W for white and Mex for Mexican. In 1940 and 1950, the census reverted its decision and made Mexicans be classified as white again and thus the instructions were to "Report white (W) for Mexicans unless they were definitely of full Indigenous Indian or other non-white races (such as Black or Asian).")

Of the over 35 million Hispanics counted in the Federal 2000 Census, 47.9% identified as White (termed White Hispanic by the Census Bureau); 42.2% some other race; 6.3% two or more races; 2% Black or African American; 1.2% American Indian and Alaska Native; 0.3% Asian; and 0.1% Native Hawaiian and Other Pacific Islander. Note that even among those Hispanics who reported one race only, most would also possess at least some ancestral lineage from one or more other races, despite the fact that only 6.3% reported as such (this is also applicable to the non-Hispanics counted in the U.S. Census, although maybe in less proportion).

According to one study (Stephens et al. 2001), from the genetic perspective, Hispanics generally represent a differential mixture of European, Native American, and African ancestry, with the proportionate mix typically depending on country of origin.

The populations of Iberia (both Spain and Portugal), like all European populations, have received multiple other influences, even though they are still largely descended from the prehistoric European populations, and to a greater degree than any other major group.

Africa

Angola
The former Portuguese colony has a community of Afro-Cubans known as Amparos. They descend from Cuban soldiers brought to the country in 1975 as a result of the Cuban involvement in the Cold War. Fidel Castro deployed thousands of troops to the country during the Angolan Civil War. As a result of this era, there exists a small Spanish-speaking community in Angola of Afro-Cubans numbering about 100,000.

Equatorial Guinea

In the former Spanish province of Equatorial Guinea, although Portuguese and French are co-official languages, the majority of the population speak Spanish. There is a small minority of African people who possessed Spanish and other European ancestry. These individuals form less than 1% of the population.

Morocco

In the former Spanish protectorate of Morocco, Spanish speakers are present in small numbers, located in the northern coastal region of the country. However the majority of Moroccan people are predominantly Arabic speaking Muslims of Berber and African ancestry.

Nigeria
The small Amaro population are descendants of repatriated Afro-Cuban indentured servants, they were called Amaros. Despite being free to return to Cuba when their tenure was over, they remained in these countries, marrying into the local native population.

Spanish territories in North Africa

Since the Reconquista, Spain has held numerous emplacements in North Africa. Most of them were promptly lost, but to date, with an approximate population of 143,000 people, the autonomous cities of Ceuta and Melilla, which constitute the two plazas de soberanía mayores (Major Territories under [Spanish] Sovereignty) remained Spanish, and the Chafarinas Islands, the Peñón de Alhucemas and the Peñón de Vélez de la Gomera, which constitute the three plazas de soberanía menores (Minor Territories under [Spanish] Sovereignty), still forming part of Spain. The Canary Islands, a constituent part of Spain's main territorial subdivisions, are also located in North Africa.

Western Sahara

In the former Spanish province of Western Sahara, Spanish is de facto official (however, in the Sahrawi Arab Democratic Republic, one of the claimants to the territory, it is de jure co-official). Most Arabic speakers speak Spanish as second language.

Asia

Philippines

In the Philippines, a Spanish Filipino is a Filipino who has Spanish or Hispanic lineage and descent, mostly born and raised in the Philippines. Most common languages spoken today by Spanish Filipinos are Philippine Spanish, Spanish; Chavacano, the only Spanish-based creole language in Asia and is spoken by over a million people; and English, which is used in the public sphere. A number of Spanish Filipinos also speak other Philippine languages.

Section 7, Article XIV of the 1987 Philippine Constitution specifies Spanish (along with Arabic) a language to "be promoted on a voluntary and optional basis", while the Philippine Academy of the Spanish Language remains the state regulating body for the language. Castilian Spanish is the sole dialectal standard taught in schools, while Philippine Spanish currently has a few thousand native speakers left.

Despite its rapid decline in the 20th century, there has been a revival of interest in the Spanish language in the first decade of the 21st century. Since the rule of President Gloria Macapagal Arroyo (herself a fluent speaker), Spanish is slowly being re-introduced into the educational system, with a revival of Spanish-language media including Filipinas Ahora Mismo, a radio programme broadcast on Radio Manila FM.

Many Philippine languages including Filipino notably contain numerous loanwords of Spanish origin.

Pacific Islands

Easter Island (Rapa Nui)
Spanish is the official language of Easter Island, a territorial possession of Chile in Polynesia.

Mariana Islands

The Mariana Islands (today split between the United States territory of Guam and the Commonwealth of the Northern Mariana Islands) were formerly governed as a part of the Spanish East Indies, and thus many Chamorros possess some degree of Spanish admixture.

While most people living on these islands no longer speak Spanish, the native Chamorro language exhibits a noticeable Spanish influence in its vocabulary. Many Chamorros have also preserved Hispanic cultural elements such as fiestas, cockfighting, and the Catholic faith despite having integrated with the American way of life.

Spanish surnames are still prevalent on Guam, it is spoken by Catholic people and Puerto Ricans, and the custom of women keeping their maiden names after marriage is a both byproduct of Spanish culture on these islands as well as the matrilineal structure of indigenous Chamorro culture.

Antarctica

In Antarctica, there are only two civilian localities and both are inhabited primarily by native Spanish speakers. One of them is the Argentine Fortín Sargento Cabral, which has 66 inhabitants. The other is the Chilean town of Villa Las Estrellas, which has a population of 150 inhabitants in summer and 80 inhabitants in winter. In each of them there is a school where students study and do research in Spanish. The Orcadas Base, an Argentine scientific station, is the oldest base in all of Antarctica still in operation and the oldest with a permanent population (since 1907).

It is also worth noting the role played by the different scientific bases in Antarctica belonging to Hispanic countries:

Religion
The Spanish and the Portuguese took the Christian faith to their colonies in the Americas, Africa, and Asia; Roman Catholicism remains the predominant religion amongst most Hispanics. A significant minority of Spanish speakers are also either Protestant or not affiliated with any religion.

See also
 List of countries where Spanish is an official language
 Flag of the Hispanic People
 List of hispanophones
 Hispanic
 Hispanicity
 Hispanism and Pan-Hispanism
 Hispanophobia
 Latino
 Language geography and Sprachraum
 Lingua franca and World language
 Anglophone, Francophone, Lusophone, the corresponding words relating to use of the English, French, and Portuguese languages, respectively

Notes

References

External links

 
Country classifications
Cultural regions
Spanish diaspora
Spanish language
Hispanidad
European civilizations
Historical regions
Modern civilizations